INAC Kobe is a Japanese football club from Kobe, founded in 2001. INAC stands for International Athletic Club while Leonessa means Lioness in Italian.

In 2006 INAC Leonessa was promoted to the Nadeshiko.League, where it has played since 2020. In 2021 they are playing in WE League. The 2008 season marked a great leap for the team as it was the runner-up both in the Nadeshiko.League and the All Japan Women's Football Championship. 2010 saw INAC lift its first title as they beat Urawa Red Diamonds in the final of the All Japan Women's Football Championship through a penalty shootout, and in 2011, coinciding with the club's 10th anniversary, the team won the double Nadeshiko.League –  All Japan Women's Football Championship.

Leonessa's 2011 squad included seven champions of the 2011 World Cup: Ayumi Kaihori, Yukari Kinga, Nahomi Kawasumi, Shinobu Ohno, Homare Sawa, Megumi Takase and Asuna Tanaka.

Kits

Kit suppliers and shirt sponsors

Players

First-team squad

Type 2
Type 2

Club staff

Honours

Domestic
WE League
Champions (1): 2021–22Nadeshiko.League Division 1Champions (3): 2011, 2012, 2013Runners-up (5): 2008, 2016, 2017, 2018, 2020Empress's CupChampions (6): 2010, 2011, 2012, 2013, 2015, 2016Runners-up (2): 2008, 2018Nadeshiko League CupChampions (1): 2013Runners-up (3): 2012, 2018, 2019

InternationalJapan/Korea Women's League ChampionshipChampions (1): 2012International Women's Club ChampionshipChampions (1): 2013Runners-up (1): 2012

Season-by-season records

Transition of team name
INAC Leonessa: 2001–2008INAC Kobe Leonessa''': 2009–present

See also
Japan Football Association (JFA)
List of women's football clubs in Japan
2022–23 in Japanese football

References

External links
 Official website

 
Women's football clubs in Japan
Association football clubs established in 2001
2001 establishments in Japan
Sports teams in Kobe
WE League clubs